Andrea Meneghin (born 8 August 1958) is an Italian bobsledder. He competed at the 1984 Winter Olympics and the 1988 Winter Olympics.

References

External links
 

1958 births
Living people
Italian male bobsledders
Olympic bobsledders of Italy
Bobsledders at the 1984 Winter Olympics
Bobsledders at the 1988 Winter Olympics
People from Conegliano
Sportspeople from the Province of Treviso